The 2001 Tampa Bay Mutiny season was the club's seventh year of existence, as well as their sixth season in Major League Soccer, and their sixth consecutive season in the top-flight of American soccer. It was also the Mutiny's last season, and the last season of pro soccer in Tampa Bay until 2010, when FC Tampa Bay joined the USSF Division 2 Professional League.

In addition to several international friendlies, the Mutiny and other MLS clubs participated in three matches of an 18-game Spring Training tournament in South Florida. Tampa Bay began the 2001 regular season by winning two of their first three games before entering the worst slump in franchise history. After a two-month winless streak, head coach Alfonso Mondelo was fired and former Tampa Bay Rowdies player Perry Van der Beck took over for the team's last 11 games. On September 9 the Mutiny played their last ever match, a 2–1 home loss to the Columbus Crew; The Mutiny still had several games scheduled, but the MLS regular season was cut short after the terrorist attacks of September 11, 2001 and the Mutiny did not qualify for the playoffs.

Despite renewing their lease with Raymond James Stadium for at least five more years, Don Garber and the MLS were unable to find new ownership for the Mutiny and the team was contracted in January 2002.

Final standings

x – clinched playoff berth

Preseason

Regular season

U.S. Open Cup
The Mutiny entered the 2001 U.S. Open Cup in the Second Round. In their first game, the Mutiny lost to the Connecticut Wolves of the second division A-League.

References

External links

Tampa Bay Mutiny
Tampa Bay
Tampa
Tampa Bay Mutiny
Tampa Bay Mutiny